Amelia Kemp is an English footballer who plays as a defender for Sunderland.

Club career
Having come through their academy system, Amelia Kemp made her first team debut for Manchester City when she replaced Lucy Bronze in an FA Women's Cup quarter-final against Sporting Club Albion on 3 April 2016.

Kemp left Manchester City the following season, joining Sunderland's academy while also playing for Durham University's women's team. In 2018–2019 she was promoted to their first team, playing in the FA Women's National League North.

Career statistics

Club

References

Living people
English women's footballers
Women's association football defenders
Manchester City W.F.C. players
Sunderland A.F.C. Ladies players
Year of birth missing (living people)